Below are the ice hockey national team rosters of the 1981 Canada Cup.

Canada
Forwards and Defence: Barry Beck, Raymond Bourque, Mike Bossy, Marcel Dionne, Ron Duguay, Brian Engblom, Clark Gillies, Danny Gare, Bob Gainey, Butch Goring, Wayne Gretzky, Craig Hartsburg, Guy Lafleur, Ken Linseman, Rick Middleton, Gilbert Perreault, Denis Potvin, Paul Reinhart, Larry Robinson, Bryan Trottier. Training camp only -- Bill Barber, Randy Carlyle, Paul Coffey, Mike Gartner, Steve Payne, Rob Ramage, Jim Schoenfeld, Darryl Sittler, Steve Shutt, Bobby Smith, Dave Taylor  
Goaltenders: Don Edwards, Mike Liut, Billy Smith. Training camp only -- Mario Lessard
Coaches: Scotty Bowman, Al MacNeil, Red Berenson, Pierre Pagé

Czechoslovakia
Forwards and Defence: Frantisek Cernik, Milan Chalupa, Jiri Dudacek, Miroslav Dvorak, Stanislav Hajdusek, Miloslav Horava, Arnold Kadlec, Jindrich Kokrment, Jaroslav Korbela, Norbert Kral, Jiri Lala, Jan Neliba, Milan Novy, Dusan Pasek,  Lubomir Penicka, Jaroslav Pouzar, Pavel Richter, Darius Rusnak, Radoslav Svoboda, Oldrich Valek
Goaltenders: Karel Lang, Jiri Kralik
Coaches: Ludek Bukac, Stanislav Nevesely

Finland
Forwards and Defence: Pekka Arbelius, Matti Hagman, Raimo Hirvonen, Juha Huikari, Kari Jalonen, Arto Javanainen, Veli-Pekka Ketola, Markku Kiimalainen, Jari Kurri, Mikko Leinonen, Tapio Levo, Kari Makkonen, Timo Nummelin, Jukka Porvari, Pekka Rautakallio, Reijo Ruotsalainen, Jorma Sevon, Risto Siltanen, Ilkka Sinisalo, Juha Tuohimaa
Goaltenders: Hannu Lassila, Markus Mattsson
Coaches: Kalevi Numminen, Kari Makinen

Sweden
Forwards and Defence: Kent-Erik Andersson, Thomas Eriksson, Jan Erixon, Thomas Gradin, Anders Håkansson, Anders Hedberg, Peter Helander, Ulf Isaksson, Tomas Jonsson, Anders Kallur, Lars Lindgren, Bengt Lundholm, Lars Molin, Kent Nilsson, Ulf Nilsson, Stefan Persson, Jörgen Pettersson, Börje Salming, Thomas Steen, Patrik Sundström, Mats Waltin Invited but unable to participate -- Bob Nystrom (declined invitation as he was negotiating his NHL contract), Mats Näslund & Bengt-Åke Gustavsson (both injured)
Goaltenders: Peter Lindmark, Pelle Lindbergh
Coaches: Anders Parmström

United States
Forwards and Defence: Bill Baker, Neal Broten, Dave Christian, Steve Christoff, Richie Dunn, Mike Eaves, Robbie Ftorek, Tom Gorence, Mark Howe, Mark Johnson, Dave Langevin, Rod Langway, Reed Larson, Rob McClanahan, Bob Miller, Warren Miller, Ken Morrow, Mike O'Connell, Dean Talafous, Tom Younghans. Training camp only -- Jack Brownschidle, Alan Hangsleben, Paul Holmgren (injured/did not play), Steve Jensen, Joe Micheletti, Joe Mullen, Bill Nyrop (missed tournament due to bout of pneumonia), Mark Pavelich, Mike Ramsey, Gordie Roberts. 
Goaltenders: Tony Esposito, Steve Baker. Training camp only -- Jim Craig (injured/did not play) 
Coaches: Bob Johnson, John Cunniff, Mike Smith

USSR
Forwards and Defence: Sergei Babinov, Zinetula Bilyaletdinov, Nikolai Drozdetsky, Viacheslav Fetisov, Irek Gimayev, Vladimir Golikov, Sergei Kapustin, Alexei Kasatonov, Andrei Khomutov, Vladimir Krutov, Igor Larionov, Sergei Makarov, Alexander Maltsev, Vasili Pervukhin, Viktor Shalimov, Sergei Shepelev, Aleksandr Skvortsov, Valeri Vasiliev, Viktor Zhluktov, Vladimir Zubkov
Goaltenders: Vladislav Tretiak, Vladimir Myshkin
Coaches: Viktor Tikhonov, Vladimir Yurzinov

Sources
"Coupe Canada 1981 Canada Cup" Official Match Program, Controlled Media Corp.,1981

Canada Cup rosters
1981 in ice hockey